Attila Csihar (born 29 March 1971), also sometimes known as Void, is a Hungarian extreme metal vocalist, best known for his vocal work in Norwegian black metal band Mayhem and American drone-doom project Sunn O))). Author Ian Christe describes his vocals as "operatic".

Biography 

His music career began in 1985 with the Hungarian metal band Tormentor, which reached cult status in black metal circles with their first album, Anno Domini (1988). Tormentor performed 50-100 live shows between 1986–1990 and became one of the most infamous bands in Hungary. After Tormentor he started his dark electro industrial band Plasma Pool (1990–1994). On the strength of his work in Tormentor, he was invited to perform vocals on the De Mysteriis Dom Sathanas album by Norwegian black metal band Mayhem after lead singer Dead committed suicide. His groundbreaking new way of singing added a special character to Mayhem's sound. Ultimately Csihar did not perform any live concerts with the band until his second tenure in 2004.

After Mayhem, Csihar continued to work in various bands, such as Plasma Pool, Aborym, and Korog; he also performed as Caiaphas in the rock opera Jesus Christ Superstar in Hungary. He stated during an interview for Hungarian Metal Hammer that he felt honoured to sing "This Jesus Must Die". He performed in Keep of Kalessin as well on their returning EP Reclaim together with drummer Frost from Satyricon.

He is a "shadow" member of the American doom/drone metal band Sunn O))). His first live performance with the band happened on 24 March 2003 at Stadtwerkstatt in Linz, Austria. His first recorded collaboration with the band was in 2004 when he sang in Sanskrit language on the tracks "Decay2 [Nihil's Maw]" and "Decay (The Symptoms of Kali Yuga)" on their album White2. He has recorded five full-length albums with the group, including the very successful Monoliths & Dimensions, and performed live with the band on their worldwide tours hundreds of shows.

In 2004, Csihar rejoined Mayhem after the departure of Maniac, the band's previous vocalist. Their 2007 album, Ordo ad Chao, won the Spellemannprisen (also known as the Norwegian Grammy). Since then the band has embarked upon intense international touring.

In 2008 he also joined another project, Gravetemple with Stephen O'Malley of Sunn O))) and Oren Ambarchi.

Csihar started his solo act in November 2008, called Void ov Voices. His live performances have been in support of artists like Ulver on their first European tour, Bohren & der Club of Gore, Lustmord, Ruin and Diamanda Galas. He performed at "The Grand Reincarnation" Of Paul Booth's Last Rites Gallery & Tattoo Theatre. He also toured in Japan and performed in Australia for the Dark Mofo festival in Hobart, Tasmania.

He has collaborated with artists such as Current 93, Jarboe, Dissection, Emperor, Taake, Ulver, and Banks Violette.

Between 2016 and 2018, Csihar joined blackened death metal supergroup Sinsaenum. He would perform lead vocals alongside Sean Zatorsky of Dååth, with ex-DragonForce bassist and group founder Frédéric Leclercq and Loudblast guitarist Stéphane Buriez on guitars, Seth guitarist Heimoth on bass, and former Slipknot drummer Joey Jordison on drums. The band released its debut album Echoes of the Tortured on 29 July 2016 via earMUSIC.

In 2019 he formed an esoteric noise project called Hiedelem with drummer/percussionist Balázs Pándi (Merzbow, Keiji Haino).

Outside of music, Csihar graduated as an electrical engineer from a technical college, and used to be a private teacher of math and physics.

He worked in film production, most notably on Tony Scott's Spy Game, where he was the first assistant of production designer Norris Spencer. In 2018 he was portrayed in the film Lords of Chaos, which depicted the early 90s Norwegian black metal scene (in particular Mayhem). He was portrayed by his son Arion.

Although Mayhem have often displayed dead animals and blood at their live events, Csihar is a vegetarian in his personal life.

Discography

Tormentor 
 The Seventh Day of Doom (1987)
 Anno Domini (1988)
 Recipe Ferrum! (1999)

Mayhem 
 De Mysteriis Dom Sathanas (1994)
 Mediolanum Capta Est (1998, guest performance)
 Ordo Ad Chao (2007)
 Esoteric Warfare (2014)
 De Mysteriis Dom Sathanas Alive (2017)
 Daemon (2019)
Atavistic Black Disorder/Kommando (2021)

Plasma Pool 
 I (1991–1994)
 II – Drowning (1991–1993)
 III – Sinking (unreleased album)

Aborym 
 Kali Yuga Bizarre (1998, guest performance)
 Fire Walk with Us! (2000)
 With No Human Intervention (2003)
 Generator (guest vocals on "Man Bites God", 2006)

Limbonic Art 
 The Ultimate Death Worship (guest vocals on "From the Shades of Hatred", 2001)

Korog 
 Korog (2005)

Attila Csihar 
 The Beast of Attila Csihar (2003, compilation album)

Void of Voices 

 777 (2012, live album, Japan Tour exclusive)

Anaal Nathrakh 
 When Fire Rains Down from the Sky, Mankind Will Reap As It Has Sown (guest vocals on "Atavism", 2003)
 Eschaton (guest vocals on "Regression to the Mean", 2006)

Keep of Kalessin 
 Reclaim (2003)

Emperor 
 Scattered Ashes (guest vocals on "Funeral Fog", Mayhem cover, 2003)

Sear Bliss 
 Glory and Perdition (additional vocals in "Birth of Eternity" and "Shores of Death", 2003)

Sunn O))) 
 White2 (2004)
 Oracle (2007)
 Dømkirke (2008)
 Monoliths & Dimensions (2009)
 Terrestrials (album) (2014)
 Kannon (2015)

Astarte 
 Demonized (guest vocals on "Lycon", 2007)

Burial Chamber Trio 
 Burial Chamber Trio (2007)

Grave Temple 
 The Holy Down (2007?)
 Ambient/Ruin (2008)
 Impassable Fears (2017)

YcosaHateRon 
 La Nuit (2007)

Stephen O'Malley 
 6°Fskyquake (2008)

Jarboe 
 Mahakali (guest vocals on "The Soul Continues", 2008)

Skitliv 
 Skandinavisk Misantropi (additional vocals on "ScumDrug", 2009)

Nader Sadek 
 In the Flesh (guest vocals on two tracks, 2010)

Ulver 
 Wars of the Roses (guest vocals on "Providence", 2010)

DivahaR 
 Divarise  (guest vocals on "Blindness") 2014
Divahar is an all-female symphonic black metal band from Yerevan, Armenia that contains Dev on vocals and guitar, Urubani on guitar, Skadi on bass, and Belus on keyboards.

Alien Vampires 
 Drag You to Hell (guest vocals on "The Divinity Of Solitude") 2015

Sinsaenum 
 Echoes of the Tortured (2016)
 Ashes (2017)
 Repulsion for Humanity (2018)

Statiqbloom 
Beneath the Whelm (guest vocals on "The Second Coming") 2020

The Mugshots 
Children of the Night / The Call (guest vocals on "The Call") 2021

References

External links 

Attila Csihar at Southern Lord
Official Mayhem website

Mayhem (band) members
21st-century Hungarian male singers
Living people
1971 births
Black metal singers
Heavy metal singers
Southern Lord Records artists
Sunn O))) members
20th-century Hungarian male singers
Sinsaenum members
Aborym members